Giovanni de Riu (10 March 1925 – 11 December 2008) was a racing driver from Italy. He failed to qualify for the 1954 Italian Grand Prix, with a privately entered Maserati.

Complete Formula One World Championship results
(key)

References

1925 births
2008 deaths
Italian Formula One drivers
Italian racing drivers